Jason Palmer (born 8 October 1984) is an English professional golfer who previously played on the European Tour.

Jason retired through injury and now Caddies for long term friend and fellow professional Chris Paisley.

Amateur career
As an amateur whilst at Birmingham University, Palmer won the 2006 Italian Amateur Open. In 2008 he followed this up with a win in the Midlands Open.

His biggest win as an amateur came in 2009 at the South of England Open Amateur Championship at Walton Heath Golf Club.

Professional career
Palmer turned professional in 2009 and initially played on the Alps Tour, his first win on the tour came at the 2010 Uniqa Financelife Open.

Following the 2010 season, Palmer joined the Challenge Tour and played a mixed schedule of Challenge Tour and Alps Tour events. His second win as a professional came in 2013 at the Friuli Venezia Giulia Open, this was followed up with two further Alps Tour wins in 2013 at the Cervino Open and the Citadelle Trophy International. In winning the Citadelle Trophy Palmer set a new tour record for the largest winning margin with a victory of 11 strokes. With these wins, Palmer won the Alps Tour Order of Merit for 2013 securing his full playing rights on the Challenge Tour for 2014.

In October 2014, Palmer achieved his first win on the Challenge Tour at the Foshan Open in China.

Palmer is also known for his unusual one-handed chipping and bunker play technique.

In January 2018, Palmer announced his retirement from professional golf via Twitter. He cited an ongoing wrist injury as the cause to the end of his playing career.

Amateur wins
2006 Italian Amateur Open
2008 Midland Open Amateur Championship
2010 South of England Open Amateur Championship

Professional wins (5)

Challenge Tour wins (1)

Alps Tour wins (4)

See also
2014 Challenge Tour graduates

References

External links

English male golfers
European Tour golfers
Sportspeople from Melton Mowbray
People from Kirby Muxloe
1984 births
Living people